Metalectra quadrisignata, the four-spotted fungus moth, is a species of moth in the family Erebidae. It is found in North America, where it has been recorded from Arizona, Florida, Georgia, Indiana, Iowa, Kentucky, Louisiana, Maine, Maryland, Massachusetts, Michigan, New Brunswick, New Hampshire, New Jersey, North Carolina, Ohio, Oklahoma, Pennsylvania, Quebec, South Carolina, Tennessee, Texas, Virginia, West Virginia and Wisconsin. The species was described by Francis Walker in 1858.

The wingspan is about 25 mm. The wings are covered with a medium greyish-brown ground colour and a diffuse blackish line runs through the black reniform spot on the forewings. 

The MONA or Hodges number for Metalectra quadrisignata is 8500.

References

 Crabo, L.; Davis, M.; Hammond, P.; Mustelin, T. & Shepard, J. (2013). "Five new species and three new subspecies of Erebidae and Noctuidae (Insecta, Lepidoptera) from Northwestern North America, with notes on Chytolita Grote (Erebidae) and Hydraecia Guenée (Noctuidae)". ZooKeys. 264: 85-123.
 Lafontaine, J. Donald & Schmidt, B. Christian (2010). "Annotated check list of the Noctuoidea (Insecta, Lepidoptera) of North America north of Mexico". ZooKeys. 40: 1-239.

Further reading

 Arnett, Ross H. (2000). American Insects: A Handbook of the Insects of America North of Mexico. CRC Press.

Boletobiinae
Moths described in 1858